José de Jesús García Ayala (May 30, 1910 – January 15, 2014) was a Mexican bishop of the Roman Catholic Church.

Biography
García Ayala was born in Yurécuaro, Michoacán, and was ordained a priest of Zamora, Michoacán on May 9, 1937.  He was appointed Auxiliary Bishop of Campeche and titular bishop of Lacedaemon on May 21, 1963, and he received his episcopal consecration on August 2, 1963. García Ayala was installed as Bishop of Campeche on May 10, 1967, and resigned from that position on February 9, 1982

See also

References

External links
Catholic-Hierarchy
Campeche Diocese (Spanish)

1910 births
2014 deaths
20th-century Roman Catholic bishops in Mexico
Participants in the Second Vatican Council
Mexican centenarians
Men centenarians
People from Zamora, Michoacán